Nawab Ali Abbas Khan (born 26 December 1957) is a Bangladeshi politician and former member of parliament.

Biography
Khan was born into the Prithimpassa family on 26 December 1957.

A member of the Jatiya Party (Ershad), he was elected as the member of parliament for Moulvibazar-2 (Kulaura Upazila) three times, in 1988, 1991 and 2008.

Khan was the senior vice president of the Central Jatiya Party (Kazi Zafar Ahmed) committee of which he is now one of the presidium members. He is also affiliated with the 20-Party Alliance. Khan's second son, Nawabzada Ali Hasib Khan, is involved with Jatiotabadi Chatrodol politics.

References 

4th Jatiya Sangsad members
5th Jatiya Sangsad members
9th Jatiya Sangsad members
Bangladesh Jatiya Party politicians
Prithimpassa family
Place of birth missing (living people)
1958 births
Living people